The Dohrmann-Buckman House is a historic house at 8455 W. Grand Avenue in River Grove, Illinois. The house was built in 1875 for original owner Frederick Dohrmann. It has a gable front plan with an Italianate design that includes a front porch with columns and a frieze, a glazed transom above the entrance, and segmental arched windows on the second floor. River Forest village clerk Henry Buckman and his wife Bertha acquired the house in 1890; the couple placed two additions on the house and built a barn on the property. The house remained in the Buckman family until 1992, when it became a historic house museum.

The house was added to the National Register of Historic Places on January 24, 1995.

References

Houses on the National Register of Historic Places in Cook County, Illinois
Italianate architecture in Illinois
Houses completed in 1875
Historic house museums in Illinois